A stallo is a large human-like creature in the folklore of the Sami.

Stallo may also refer to:
 Stallo (computer), a supercomputer at the University of Tromsø, Norway
 Stallo, Mississippi, an unincorporated community in Neshoba County, Mississippi
 John Stallo (1823–1900), a German-American academic